Jalan Bukit Belimbing (Selangor state route B37) is a major road in Selangor, Malaysia.

List of junctions

Roads in Selangor